The 19th edition of the Tour of Flanders for Women, a women's cycling race in Belgium, was held on 3 April 2022, serving as the 6th event of the 2021 UCI Women's World Tour. It was won in the sprint by the Belgian champion Lotte Kopecky ahead of Annemiek van Vleuten and Chantal van den Broek-Blaak.

Results

See also
 2022 in women's road cycling

References

2022
Tour of Flanders for Women
Tour of Flanders for Women
April 2022 sports events in Belgium